This is a list of television programs formerly broadcast by the Canadian television channel bpm:tv, which ran from 2001 to 2015.

External links
 bpm:tv

bpm:tv